The tymoviruses/pomovirusesfamily tRNA-like 3' UTR element is an RNA element found in the 3' UTR of some viruses. This element acts in conjunction with UPSK RNA and a 5'-cap to enhance translation. The secondary structure of this RNA element is a cloverleaf that resembles tRNA.

References

External links 
 

Cis-regulatory RNA elements
Tymoviridae